Apatite is a group of phosphate minerals, usually hydroxyapatite, fluorapatite and chlorapatite, with high concentrations of OH−, F− and Cl− ion, respectively, in the crystal. The formula of the admixture of the three most common endmembers is written as Ca10(PO4)6(OH,F,Cl)2, and the crystal unit cell formulae of the individual minerals are written as Ca10(PO4)6(OH)2, Ca10(PO4)6F2 and Ca10(PO4)6Cl2.

The mineral was named apatite by the German geologist Abraham Gottlob Werner in 1786, although the specific mineral he had described was reclassified as fluorapatite in 1860 by the German mineralogist Karl Friedrich August Rammelsberg. Apatite is often mistaken for other minerals. This tendency is reflected in the mineral's name, which is derived from the Greek word ἀπατάω (apatáō), which means to deceive.

Geology

Apatite is very common as an accessory mineral in igneous and metamorphic rocks, where it is the most common phosphate mineral. However, occurrences are usually as small grains which are often visible only in thin section. Coarsely crystalline apatite is usually restricted to pegmatites, gneiss derived from sediments rich in carbonate minerals, skarns, or marble. Apatite is also found in clastic sedimentary rock as grains eroded out of the source rock. Phosphorite is a phosphate-rich sedimentary rock containing as much as 80% apatite, which is present as cryptocrystalline masses referred to as collophane. Economic quantities of apatite are also sometimes found in nepheline syenite or in carbonatites.

Apatite is the defining mineral for 5 on the Mohs scale. It can be distinguished in the field from beryl and tourmaline by its relative softness. It is often fluorescent under ultraviolet light.

Apatite is one of a few minerals produced and used by biological micro-environmental systems. Hydroxyapatite, also known as hydroxylapatite, is the major component of tooth enamel and bone mineral. A relatively rare form of apatite in which most of the OH groups are absent and containing many carbonate and acid phosphate substitutions is a large component of bone material.

Fluorapatite (or fluoroapatite) is more resistant to acid attack than is hydroxyapatite; in the mid-20th century, it was discovered that communities whose water supply naturally contained fluorine had lower rates of dental caries. Fluoridated water allows exchange in the teeth of fluoride ions for hydroxyl groups in apatite. Similarly, toothpaste typically contains a source of fluoride anions (e.g. sodium fluoride, sodium monofluorophosphate). Too much fluoride results in dental fluorosis and/or skeletal fluorosis.

Fission tracks in apatite are commonly used to determine the thermal histories of orogenic belts and of sediments in sedimentary basins. (U-Th)/He dating of apatite is also well established from noble gas diffusion studies for use in determining thermal histories and other, less typical applications such as paleo-wildfire dating.

Uses
The primary use of apatite is as a source of phosphate in the manufacture of fertilizer and in other industrial uses. It is occasionally used as a gemstone. Ground apatite was used as a pigment for the Terracotta Army of 3rd-century BCE China, and in Qing Dynasty enamel for metalware.

During digestion of apatite with sulfuric acid to make phosphoric acid, hydrogen fluoride is produced as a byproduct from any fluorapatite content. This byproduct is a minor industrial source of hydrofluoric acid. Apatite is also occasionally a source of uranium and vanadium, present as trace elements in the mineral.

Fluoro-chloro apatite forms the basis of the now obsolete Halophosphor fluorescent tube phosphor system. Dopant elements of manganese and antimony, at less than one mole-percentin place of the calcium and phosphorus impart the fluorescenceand adjustment of the fluorine-to-chlorine ratio alter the shade of white produced. This system has been almost entirely replaced by the Tri-Phosphor system.

Apatites are also a proposed host material for storage of nuclear waste, along with other phosphates.

Gemology

Apatite is infrequently used as a gemstone. Transparent stones of clean color have been faceted, and chatoyant specimens have been cabochon-cut. Chatoyant stones are known as cat's-eye apatite, transparent green stones are known as asparagus stone, and blue stones have been called moroxite. If crystals of rutile have grown in the crystal of apatite, in the right light the cut stone displays a cat's-eye effect.  Major sources for gem apatite are Brazil, Myanmar, and Mexico. Other sources include Canada, Czech Republic, Germany, India, Madagascar, Mozambique, Norway, South Africa, Spain, Sri Lanka, and the United States.

Use as an ore mineral 

Apatite is occasionally found to contain significant amounts of rare-earth elements and can be used as an ore for those metals.  This is preferable to traditional rare-earth ores such as monazite, as apatite is not very radioactive and does not pose an environmental hazard in mine tailings.
However, apatite often contains uranium and its equally radioactive decay-chain nuclides.

The town of Apatity in the Arctic North of Russia was named for its mining operations for these ores.

Apatite is an ore mineral at the Hoidas Lake rare-earth project.

Thermodynamics
The standard enthalpies of formation in the crystalline state of hydroxyapatite, chlorapatite and a preliminary value for bromapatite, have been determined by reaction-solution calorimetry. Speculations on the existence of a possible fifth member of the calcium apatites family, iodoapatite, have been drawn from energetic considerations.

Structural and thermodynamic properties of crystal hexagonal calcium apatites, Ca10(PO4)6(X)2 (X= OH, F, Cl, Br), have been investigated using an all-atom Born-Huggins-Mayer potential by a molecular dynamics technique. The accuracy of the model at room temperature and atmospheric pressure was checked against crystal structural data, with maximum deviations of c. 4% for the haloapatites and 8% for hydroxyapatite. High-pressure simulation runs, in the range 0.5–75 kbar, were performed in order to estimate the isothermal compressibility coefficient of those compounds. The deformation of the compressed solids is always elastically anisotropic, with BrAp exhibiting a markedly different behavior from those displayed by HOAp and ClAp. High-pressure p-V data were fitted to the Parsafar-Mason equation of state with an accuracy better than 1%.

The monoclinic solid phases Ca10(PO4)6(X)2 (X= OH, Cl) and the molten hydroxyapatite compound have also been studied by molecular dynamics.

Lunar science
Moon rocks collected by astronauts during the Apollo program contain traces of apatite. Following new insights about the presence of water in the moon, re-analysis of these samples in 2010 revealed water trapped in the mineral as hydroxyl, leading to estimates of water on the lunar surface at a rate of at least 64 parts per billion100 times greater than previous estimatesand as high as 5 parts per million.  If the minimum amount of mineral-locked water was hypothetically converted to liquid, it would cover the Moon's surface in roughly one meter of water.

Bio-leaching
The ectomycorrhizal fungi Suillus granulatus and Paxillus involutus can release elements from apatite. Release of phosphate from apatite is one of the most important activities of mycorrhizal fungi, which increase phosphorus uptake.

See also 
 List of minerals
 Thermal history modelling
 Hexafluorosilicic acid
 Hydroxyapatite in bone
 How To Cleanse Apatite

References

Calcium minerals
Gemstones
Halide minerals
Hexagonal minerals
Minerals in space group 176
Phosphate minerals
Piezoelectric materials